Progressive Federation (in Spanish: Federación Progresista; FP) was a socialist, ecologist and pacifist political party in Spain. It was created in 1984 by a group led by Ramón Tamanes that split from the Communist Party of Spain (PCE).

History
FE was officially registered in December 1984, and in February 1985 the party launched its manifesto. The platform called for a green, red and white alternative for Spain. In July 1985 FP held its constituent congress, and the next year the party participated in the Anti-NATO Civic Platform. In 1986 FP joined United Left, leaving the coalition in 1987. The party dissolved by 1988.

Ramón Tamanes was elected MP (in the lists of the United Left coalition) in the general elections of 1986.

Electoral performance

Cortes Generales

References

Socialist parties in Spain
United Left (Spain)